The Stylings of Silver is an album by jazz pianist Horace Silver released on the Blue Note label in 1957 featuring performances by Silver with Art Farmer, Hank Mobley, Teddy Kotick, and Louis Hayes.

Reception
The Allmusic review by Scott Yanow awarded the album 3 stars and states "All of Silver's Blue Note quintet recordings are consistently superb and swinging and, although not essential, this is a very enjoyable set".

Track listing
All compositions by Horace Silver except as indicated
 "No Smokin'" - 5:33
 "The Back Beat" - 6:23
 "Soulville" - 6:16
 "Home Cookin'" - 6:28
 "Metamorphosis" - 7:18
 "My One and Only Love" - (Robert Mellin, Guy Wood) - 6:59
Recorded at Rudy Van Gelder Studio, Hackensack, NJ, May 8, 1957.

Personnel
Horace Silver - piano
Art Farmer - trumpet
Hank Mobley - tenor saxophone
Teddy Kotick - bass
Louis Hayes - drums

References

Horace Silver albums
1957 albums
Blue Note Records albums
Albums produced by Alfred Lion
Albums recorded at Van Gelder Studio